Forrest City is a city in St. Francis County, Arkansas, United States, and the county seat. It was named for General Nathan Bedford Forrest, a notable Confederate military leader. Shortly after the end of the Civil War, he had a construction crew camped here, who were completing a railroad between Memphis and Little Rock. 

The population was 15,371 at the 2010 census, an increase from 14,774 in 2000. The city identifies as the "Jewel of the Delta".

History
On October 13, 1827, St. Francis County, located in the east central part of Arkansas, was officially organized by the Arkansas Territorial Legislature in Little Rock. Nathan Bedford Forrest, a notable Confederate General, became interested in the area around Crowley's Ridge during the Civil War. 

In 1866 General Forrest and C. C. McCreanor contracted to finish the Memphis & Little Rock Railroad from Madison located on the St. Francis River to DeValls Bluff on the west bank of the White River.  The route traversed the challenging Crowley's Ridge and L'Anguille River bottoms.  The first trains came through in 1868.

General Forrest later built a commissary on Front Street.  Colonel V.B. Izard began the task of designing the town at the same time.  Most residents were calling the area "Forrest's Town," later to be known as Forrest City, incorporated May 11, 1870.  

The county seat was initially located in the now defunct town of Franklin until 1840, when it was moved to Madison.  In 1855 it was moved to Mount Vernon, where the court house burned in 1856 destroying county records. This  prompted a move back to Madison.  

The county seat was moved to Forrest City in 1874, where the courthouse was assigned to a wooden structure.  When it burned shortly thereafter, county records were again destroyed. In 1889, the city was the site of a white race riot that resulted in their expulsion of African American leaders.

In 1940, Forrest City was a stop for the Choctaw Rocket, a passenger train operated by the Chicago, Rock Island and Pacific Railroad.  Service was discontinued in 1964.

Evidence that giant mastodons roamed the slope was revealed in 1949 when workmen excavating for sewer improvements found bones of the massive beasts within the city limits.

Forrest City High School held its first integrated prom in 1988.  After school integration was ordered in the mid-1960s, Forrest City eliminated school-sponsored dances and social activities.  For 23 years, social clubs and individual families had organized a racially segregated prom.

Despite being named after Nathan Bedford Forrest, Forrest City already had a third African American mayor, current Mayor Cedric Williams, in 2018.

Geography
Forrest City is located at  (35.010131, -90.788716).  Technically Forrest City is in northeast Arkansas using standard navigational methods.. 

Forrest City is located on Crowley's Ridge, a geological phenomenon that rises above the flat Mississippi Delta terrain that surrounds it. This north-south running highland is some three miles wide and 300 feet above sea level. Several species of trees not indigenous to Arkansas are found here, including beech, butternut, sugar maple, and cucumber trees.

Demographics

2020 census

As of the 2020 United States Census, there were 13,015 people, 4,358 households, and 2,655 families residing in the city.

2000 census
As of the census of 2000, there were 14,774 people, 4,581 households, and 3,165 families residing in the city. The racial makeup of the city was 60.93% Black or African American, 35.52% White, 8.26% of the population were Hispanic or Latino, 0.74% Asian, 0.30% from other races, 0.19% Native American, and 2.31% from two or more races.

There were 4,581 households, out of which 37.5% had children under the age of 18 living with them, 37.2% were married couples living together, 28.0% had a female householder with no husband present, and 30.9% were non-families. 27.9% of all households were made up of individuals, and 11.9% had someone living alone who was 65 years of age or older. The average household size was 2.65 and the average family size was 3.23.

In the city, the population was spread out, with 27.5% under the age of 18, 10.5% from 18 to 24, 32.3% from 25 to 44, 18.5% from 45 to 64, and 11.1% who were 65 years of age or older. The median age was 32 years. For every 100 females, there were 116.1 males. For every 100 females age 18 and over, there were 121.6 males.

The median income for a household in the city was $23,111, and the median income for a family was $27,432. Males had a median income of $29,313 versus $21,295 for females. The per capita income for the city was $11,716. About 29.0% of families and 33.4% of the population were below the poverty line, including 45.9% of those under age 18 and 22.3% of those age 65 or over.

Government and infrastructure
The Federal Bureau of Prisons Federal Correctional Complex, Forrest City is in Forrest City.

The United States Postal Service operates the Forrest City Post Office.

Woodruff Electric Cooperative, a non-profit rural electric utility cooperative, is headquartered in Forrest City.

Local landmarks

The Forrest City Chamber of Commerce is located in the 100-year-old Becker House. This house has served a variety of functions since being sold by the Becker family. It was an antique store and later a home furnishings boutique before being occupied by the Chamber.

Forrest City had five sites listed on the National Register of Historic Places including:
 Campbell House
 First United Methodist
 Forrest City High School (aka, "Old Central")
 Mann House
 Stuart Springs

Education
Forrest City School District operates public schools, including Forrest City High School.

Circa 2014 KIPP Delta established the grade 5-8 KIPP Forrest City College Preparatory School in Forrest City, which occupied several temporary buildings and a portion of a Catholic church which had a lease agreement with KIPP. In 2018 KIPP Delta asked the State of Arkansas for permission to close KIPP Forrest City and send students to the Helena-West Helena facility.

Notable people
 Barrett Astin, former professional baseball player
 Little Buddy Doyle, blues guitarist, singer and songwriter.
 Lewis P. Featherstone, Labor Party U.S. Representative from Arkansas.
 Al Green, singer and minister.
 Willie Hale, Rhythm and Blues guitarist, singer and songwriter.
 John W. Henry, principal owner of the Boston Red Sox.
 Chris Hicky, music video director
 Mark W. Izard, 3rd Governor of the Nebraska Territory; moved to Forrest City.
 Jason Jones, professional football player.
 Don Kessinger, born in Forrest City, professional baseball player and manager.
 Albert King, blues artist who spent much of childhood and early professional career in Forrest City.
 Henry Loeb, mayor of Memphis, Tennessee; moved to Forrest City.
 Cara McCollum, 2013 Miss New Jersey.
 Gilbert Morris, award-winning Christian author.
 King Perry, jazz saxophonist, clarinetist, arranger, and bandleader.
 Jimmy Rogers, football player.
 Cal Slayton, comic book artist; grew up in Forrest City.
 Vernon Sykes, member of the Ohio House of Representatives.
 Dwight Tosh, Republican member of the Arkansas House of Representatives from Jonesboro; former Forrest City resident
 Winston P. Wilson, U.S. Air Force Major General and Chief of the National Guard Bureau; moved to Forrest City.
 Dennis Winston, NFL player.
 G. Wood, one of four actors to appear in both the 1970 film M*A*S*H and the television series M*A*S*H.
 Marshall Wright, Forrest City lawyer and former member of the Arkansas House of Representatives.

See also

 Forrest City Municipal Airport
 Forrest City School District

References

External links

 Forrest City website
 Forrest City Chamber of Commerce

 
Cities in Arkansas
Micropolitan areas of Arkansas
Cities in St. Francis County, Arkansas
County seats in Arkansas
Populated places established in 1870
Nathan Bedford Forrest
1870 establishments in Arkansas